The José Miguel Gallardo School (Spanish: Escuela José Miguel Gallardo) is a historic school located in Juncos, Puerto Rico. The school was named after academic and politician José Miguel Gallardo. The main structure of the school today serves as a public library, and it was added to the United States National Register of Historic Places in 2012.

References 

School buildings on the National Register of Historic Places in Puerto Rico
1940 establishments in Puerto Rico
Libraries in Puerto Rico
School buildings completed in 1940
Beaux-Arts architecture in Puerto Rico
Buildings and structures on the National Register of Historic Places in Puerto Rico
Libraries on the National Register of Historic Places
Juncos, Puerto Rico